The Senegalese Women's Mayor Cup (in French: Coupe du Maire) is the national basketball cup for women's basketball teams in Senegal.

Champions

Performances by club

References

Basketball in Senegal